Sinam-guyŏk is a district of the 7 kuyŏk that constitute Chongjin, North Hamgyong Province, North Korea.

Administrative divisions 
Sinam-guyok is divided into 10 neighbourhoods (tong).

References 

Districts of Chongjin